is a railway station in the town of Yokohama, Kamikita District, Aomori Prefecture, Japan, operated by East Japan Railway Company (JR East).

Lines
Fukkoshi Station is served by the Ōminato Line, and is located 23.0 kilometers from the terminus of the line at Noheji Station.

Station layout
The station has one ground-level side platform serving a single bidirectional track. There is no station building, but only a small rain shelter for passengers on the platform. The station is unattended.

History
Fukkoshi Station was opened on September 25, 1921. With the privatization of Japanese National Railways (JNR) on April 1, 1987, the station came under the operational control of JR East.

Surrounding area

See also
 List of Railway Stations in Japan

External links

  

Railway stations in Aomori Prefecture
Ōminato Line
Railway stations in Japan opened in 1943
Yokohama, Aomori